The Bundesstraße 191 or B 191 is a German federal road. It begins in Celle at the B 3 and ends at the new bypass north of Plau am See connecting to the B 103.

History

Origins 
The old unmetalled road between Ludwigslust and Parchim was upgraded in 1845 to a surfaced road. One year later roadworks were completed as far as Lübz and, in 1936, the first road bridge over the Elbe was opened in Dömitz .

Old routes and names 
In 1937 the road was designated as Reichsstraße 191. During the division of Germany it was interrupted at the Inner German Border where the Elbe bridge had been partly destroyed in an airstrike in April 1945. The western section between Celle and the banks of the Elbe near Dannenberg (Elbe) belonged to West Germany and was called the Bundesstraße 191. The eastern section between Dömitz and Plau am See belonged to East Germany and was known as Fernverkehrsstraße 191 (abbr: F 191).

Since the rebuilding of the 970 m long Elbe Bridge at Dömitz in 1992 it has been possible to drive along this federal highway from end to end.

See also 
 List of federal highways in Germany

External links 

B191
191
B191